The 2006 European Junior Swimming Championships were held from July 6 to July 9, 2006, in Palma de Mallorca, Spain. The age groups for this event were girls born in 1990 or 1991 and boys born in 1988 or 1989.

Medal table

Medal summary

Boy's events

|-
| 50 m freestyle

|-
| 100 m freestyle

 
|-
| 200 m freestyle

|-
| 400 m freestyle

|-
| 1500 m freestyle

|-
| 50 m backstroke

|-
| 100 m backstroke

|-
| 200 m backstroke

|-
| 50 m breaststroke

|-
| 100 m breaststroke

|-
| 200 m breaststroke

|-
| 50 m butterfly

|-
| 100 m butterfly

|-
| 200 m butterfly

|-
| 200 m individual medley

|-
| 400 m individual medley

|-
| 4 × 100 m freestyle relay

|-
| 4 × 200 m freestyle relay

|-
| 4 × 100 m medley relay

|}

Girl's events

|-
| 50 m freestyle

|-
| 100 m freestyle

|-
| 200 m freestyle

|-
| 400 m freestyle

|-
| 800 m freestyle

|-
| 50 m backstroke

|-
| 100 m backstroke

|-
| 200 m backstroke

|-
| 50 m breaststroke

|-
| 100 m breaststroke

|-
| 200 m breaststroke

|-
| 50 m butterfly

|-
| 100 m butterfly

|-
| 200 m butterfly

|-
| 200 m individual medley

|-
| 400 m individual medley

|-
| 4 × 100 m freestyle relay

|-
| 4 × 200 m freestyle relay

|-
| 4 × 100 m medley relay

|}

European Junior Swimming Championships
J
European Junior 2006
2006 in Spanish sport
Swimming competitions in Spain
Swimming
July 2006 sports events in Europe